Robert Everett Coyle (May 6, 1930 – May 7, 2012) was a United States district judge of the United States District Court for the Eastern District of California.

Education and career

Coyle was born in Fresno, California and received an Artium Baccalaureus degree from Fresno State College (now California State University, Fresno) in 1953 and a Juris Doctor from the University of California, Hastings College of the Law in 1956. He was a Deputy district attorney of Fresno County, California from 1956 to 1958. He was in private practice in Fresno from 1958 to 1982.

Federal judicial service

On March 11, 1982, Coyle was nominated by President Ronald Reagan to a seat on the United States District Court for the Eastern District of California vacated by Judge Myron Donovan Crocker. Coyle was confirmed by the United States Senate on March 31, 1982, and received his commission on April 1, 1982. He served as Chief Judge from 1990 to 1996, assuming senior status on May 13, 1996. He served in that status until his death on May 7, 2012, in Fresno.

References

Sources
 
 

1930 births
People from Fresno, California
California State University, Fresno alumni
University of California, Hastings College of the Law alumni
Judges of the United States District Court for the Eastern District of California
United States district court judges appointed by Ronald Reagan
20th-century American judges
2012 deaths